The Rural Municipality of North Norfolk is a former rural municipality (RM) in the Canadian province of Manitoba. It was originally incorporated as a rural municipality on January 1, 1883. It ceased on January 1, 2015 as a result of its provincially mandated amalgamation with the Town of MacGregor to form the Municipality of North Norfolk.

References

External links 
 
 Map of North Norfolk R.M. at Statcan

North Norfolk
Populated places disestablished in 2015
2015 disestablishments in Manitoba
1883 establishments in Manitoba